WQOH may refer to:

 WQOH-FM, a radio station (88.7 FM) licensed to serve Springville, Alabama, United States
 WMMA (AM), a radio station (1480 AM) licensed to serve Irondale, Alabama, which held the call sign WQOH from 2008 to 2016